The 2018 Los Angeles Gladiators was the first season of the Los Angeles Gladiators's existence in the Overwatch League. The team finished with a regular season record of 25–15 – the fourth best in the Overwatch League.

Los Angeles qualified for the Stage 3 and Stage 4 Playoffs. The team lost in the Stage 3 semifinals to the Boston Uprising. In the Stage 4 semifinals, the Gladiators lost to the Los Angeles Valiant. The team also qualified for the Season Playoffs, but lost to the London Spitfire in the quarterfinals.

Preceding offseason 
On November 2, Gladiators unveiled their initial 7-player inaugural season roster, consisting of the following players:
Lane "Surefour" Roberts
João Pedro "Hydration" Goes Telles
Kim "Bischu" Hyung-seok
Jonas "Shaz" Suovaara
Benjamin "BigGoose" Isohanni
Choi "Asher" Jun-sung
Luis "iRemiix" Galarza Figueroa
The team revealed that the players were picked from a conglomeration of professional Overwatch esports teams to suit an "aggressive and fun" playstyle the team hoped to emulate as a reflection of their personality.

Review

Regular season 
Their debut match was a 4–0 victory over the Shanghai Dragons. They finished Stage 1 with a 4–6 record in 8th place.

Heading into Stage 2, the team announced the transfer of tank player Baek "Fissure" Chan-hyung from the London Spitfire. Following the acquisition of Fissure, the team finished the stage in fifth place with a 6–4 record, including a 4–0 sweep over the Valiant.

Between Stages 2 and 3, the Gladiators acquired Ted "silkthread" Wang from the Valiant and Kang "Void" Jun-woo from Kongdoo Panthera. However, visa issues would cause Void to completely miss out on Stage 3. The Gladiators finished Stage 3 with a 6–4 record in fourth place, which, beginning with the third stage, was the final stage playoff spot. The top-seeded Boston Uprising, undefeated in Stage 3, selected the Gladiators as their first round opponent. On May 6, the Uprising swept the Gladiators 3–0.

The Gladiators, now regularly using Void in their lineup following his visa being approved, finished with a league-best 9–1 record in Stage 4, including a reverse sweep over back-to-back stage champions New York Excelsior. However, the team would unexpectedly choose the second-seeded Valiant as their semi-final opposition. The Valiant would subsequently defeat the Gladiators in the Stage Playoffs by a score of 3–2. They would end the season with a 25–15 record, good for 4th place and a spot in the postseason where they would face against the London Spitfire.

Season playoffs 
On July 11, the first day of the season's playoffs, the fourth-seeded Gladiators took a 1–0 series lead after defeating the fifth-seeded Spitfire 3–0 in their first ever playoffs match. The Gladiators made headlines by surprisingly announcing on the day of the first match that main tank Fissure would be benched in favor of Luis "iRemiix" Galarza Figueroa. Later on the same day, Fissure was revealed by Blizzard as the runner-up in the inaugural Overwatch League season MVP vote. Two days later, the Gladiators would be eliminated from the playoffs after the Spitfire shut out the Gladiators in back-to-back matches to win the series 2–1.

Final roster

Transactions 
Transactions of/for players on the roster during the 2018 regular season:
On February 13, Gladiators acquired Baek "Fissure" Chan-hyung from London Spitfire.
On March 25, Gladiators signed Kang "Void" Jun-woo.
On April 3, Gladiators acquired Ted "silkthread" Wang from Los Angeles Valiant.

Standings

Record by stage

League

Game log

Preseason

Regular season

Playoffs

References 

2018 Overwatch League seasons by team
Los Angeles Gladiators
Los Angeles Gladiators seasons